East India is a region of India consisting of the states of West Bengal, Bihar, Jharkhand, and Odisha.

East India may also refer to: 

 East Indies, a term used by Europeans from the 16th century onwards to identify what is now known as South Asia and Southeast Asia
 East India Company, an English joint-stock company founded in 1600 
 East India Docks, a small group of docks in the Blackwall area of East London
 East India DLR station, a railway station in East London

East Indian may also refer to:

 East Indians, a Marathi-speaking, Roman Catholic ethnic group in Mumbai, India
 East Indian language is the dialect of Marathi, spoken by East Indians people in Mumbai, India
 East Indians, a term used in North America to refer to South Asians in North America, in order to distinguish them from Native Americans who are sometimes referred to as Indians
 Indian Americans, residents of the United States descended from migrants from India 
 Indo-Canadians, residents of Canada descended from migrants from India
 Indo-Caribbeans, residents of Caribbean countries descended from migrants from India

See also
 Indian subcontinent
 East India Company (disambiguation)
 East Indies (disambiguation)
 East India Club
 Dutch East Indies, the Dutch colony that became modern Indonesia following World War II